Ryan Murray (born 11 August 1987) is a Scottish professional darts player who competes in Professional Darts Corporation (PDC) events.

Career
In 2017, Murray had the misfortune of having Michael van Gerwen hit two nine-dart finishes against him in the same match during a UK Open Qualifier.

Murray entered PDC Q-School in January 2020 and won his tour card on the fourth day by finishing second on the UK Q-School Order of Merit. He will play on the PDC ProTour in 2020 and 2021.

World Championship results

PDC
 2021: Second round (lost to Michael van Gerwen 1–3)

References

External links

1987 births
Living people
Professional Darts Corporation former tour card holders
Scottish darts players
Sportspeople from Edinburgh